The Coat of arms of Peru is the national symbolic emblem of Peru. Four variants are used: the Coat of arms per se; the National Coat of arms, or National Shield; the Great Seal of the State; and the Naval Coat of arms.

Official description
Peruvian law describes the coat of arms as follows:

"The arms of the Peruvian Nation shall consist of a shield divided into three fields: one celestial blue to the right, with a vicuna looking inside; other white to the left, with a Cinchona officinalis placed within, and another, red, in the bottom and smaller, with a cornucopia pouring coins, signifying with these symbols the treasures of Peru in the three realms of nature. The coat of arms shall be surmounted by a civic crown in flat view; and accompanied on each side by a flag and a standard of national colors, further described below."

Variants

The Coat of arms
The coat of arms has a palm branch on its left and a laurel one on its right, tied by a red and white ribbon, as well as a Holm oak civic crown above it. These represent victory and glory. This variant is used on the national ensign or state flag. Its use on its own is infrequent, except on currency, both on coins and bills, and stamps.

The National Coat of arms
The National Coat of arms, or National Shield, consists of the shield plus a Peruvian flag and a standard on each side, and a Civic Crown as crest. It is used on the war flag. Its use on its own is mandated for all public buildings, with the name of the entity under it.

The Great Seal of the State
The Great Seal of the State, consisting of the National Shield and the semicircular inscription "" ("Republic of Peru") above it, is used on official documents.

The Naval Coat of arms
The Naval Coat of Arms, consists of the National Shield and the semicircular inscription "", along with anchors instead of the traditional flags it is embedded upon, as well as having an image of the sun as the crest. It is used for various naval purposes.

History

First version 

The first version of the Coat of Arms of Peru was designed by General José de San Martín and officially declared on 21 October 1820. It consisted of a landscape of Inti, the sun rising from the Andes, seen from the sea, and escorted by laurel branches tied with a golden ribbon.

In the shield, on a blue sky background, the sun's yellow rays can be seen behind the dark brown mountains rising above the blue and green ocean.

The flags of the South American nations and a banana tree can be seen behind the shield. A condor on the left and a llama on the right act as supporters.

This was on top of a baroque base, with a scroll under it with the motto "Renació el sol del Perú" ("Peru's sun is reborn") in capital letters. Some flowers, branches and ammunition were on the base.

Second version

On 25 February 1825, Simón Bolívar and the Constituent Congress proclaimed a law defining the new national symbols. establishing the new Coat of Arms, similar to the one used today. This was designed by Congressmen José Gregorio Paredes and Francisco Javier Cortés. The official description was the following:

"Las armas de la Nación Peruana constarán de un escudo dividido en tres campos (forma polaca), uno azul celeste, a la derecha, que llevará una vicuña mirando al interior; otro blanco, a la izquierda, donde se colocará el árbol de la quina; y otro rojo inferior y más pequeño en que se verá una cornucopia derramando monedas, significándose con estos símbolos, las preciosidades del Perú en los tres reinos naturales. El escudo tendrá por timbre una corona cívica vista de plano; e irá acompañada en cada lado de una bandera y un estandarte de los colores nacionales, señalado más adelante."

"The arms of the Peruvian Nation shall consist of a shield divided into three fields (Polish shape), one light-blue, to the left, which will carry a vicuña looking inwards; another white, on the right, where a cinchona tree will be located; and another red below and smaller in which a cornucopia will be seen spilling coins, signifying with these symbols, the richnesses of Peru in the three natural kingdoms. The shield shall have as crest a Civic Crown seen flat; and shall be escorted on each side by a flag and standard of the same national colors, described later."

Within the Peru-Bolivia Confederation

From 1836 to 1839, Peru was temporarily dissolved into the Republics of South Peru and North Peru, which joined Bolivia to form the Peru–Bolivian Confederation.

The South was formed first, thus adopting a new coat of arms: A golden inti sun with four small stars above it (representing Arequipa, Ayacucho, Cuzco and Puno, the four groups of the republic). The North kept the original coat of arms.

After the dissolution of the Confederation, the old Republic of Peru was restored to its 1836 composition, as were its national symbols.

1950 modification

This is the coat of arms used today and is a modification of the second version. Until 1950, the coat of arms was a symbol of both the nation and the state, and presented some difficulties in its design. These generated that, months after its creation, that the seals of ministries modified the law, cutting the width of the shield to design the cornucopia comfortably, and getting rid of the escorting flags.

The last modification was in March 1950, during General Manuel A. Odría’s administration. In this way, the coat of arms was split in halves, and the lower section became the largest, rather than the smallest. The national coat of arms was created simultaneously as a heraldic symbol of the State.

See also
 Flag of Peru

References

Peru
Peru
Peru
Peru
Peru
Peru
Peru
National symbols of Peru